Contentment, also known as the Grattan House, is a historic home located near Mount Crawford, Rockingham County, Virginia. It was built in 1823, and is a two-story, five bay, brick Federal style dwelling.  It has a pair of slightly projecting interior end chimneys placed at each end of the standing-seam metal gable roof with a brick parapet between each pair.  During the American Civil War, on June 2–3, 1864, the house served as the headquarters of Confederate General John D. Imboden the Battle of Piedmont.  It was also the site of one of the major skirmishes before the Confederate defeat at Cedar Creek, near Winchester.  That skirmish was initiated by General Jubal Early and began at Contentment on October 4, 1864.

It was listed on the National Register of Historic Places in 2006.

References

Houses on the National Register of Historic Places in Virginia
Federal architecture in Virginia
Houses completed in 1823
Houses in Rockingham County, Virginia
National Register of Historic Places in Rockingham County, Virginia